Katharina Menz (born 8 October 1990) is a German judoka. She won one of the bronze medals in the women's 48 kg event at the 2020 European Judo Championships held in Prague, Czech Republic. She also won one of the bronze medals in the mixed team event at the 2020 Summer Olympics held in Tokyo, Japan.

Career
She competed in the women's 48 kg event at the 2017 World Judo Championships held in Budapest, Hungary.

In 2019, she represented Germany at the European Games held in Minsk, Belarus. She competed in the women's 48 kg event where she was eliminated in her first match.

In 2021, she competed in the women's 48 kg event at the Judo World Masters held in Doha, Qatar. She also represented Germany at the 2020 Summer Olympics in Tokyo, Japan. She competed in the women's 48 kg event where she was eliminated in her first match. She won one of the bronze medals in the mixed team event.

Achievements

References

External links
 

Living people
1990 births
Place of birth missing (living people)
German female judoka
European Games competitors for Germany
Judoka at the 2019 European Games
Judoka at the 2020 Summer Olympics
Olympic judoka of Germany
Medalists at the 2020 Summer Olympics
Olympic bronze medalists for Germany
Olympic medalists in judo
21st-century German women